This article lists the oldest known surviving buildings constructed in the Americas, including on each of the regions and within each country.
"Building" is defined as any human-made structure used or interface for supporting or sheltering any use or continuous occupancy. In order to qualify for this list a structure must:
 be a recognisable building;
 incorporate features of building work from the claimed date to at least 1.5 metres (4.9 ft) in height;
 be largely complete or include building work to this height for most of its perimeter.
 contains an enclosed area with at least one entry point.

Pre-Columbian era

16th century

17th century

18th century

19th century

See also
San Basilio de Palenque, according to UNESCO it was the first free African town in the Americas, located 50 kilometres (31 mi) from Cartagena de Indias, Colombia.
List of the oldest buildings in the United States
 List of oldest known surviving buildings

References

Historic preservation
Americas
Oldest buildings in the Americas
Americas
Americas-related lists